Mall of Joy may refer to:
 Mall of Joy, Kottayam, a shopping mall located at Kottayam, Kerala
 Mall of Joy, Thrissur, a shopping mall located at Thrissur, Kerala